Dundas County may refer to:
 Dundas County, Ontario
 Dundas County, Victoria

County name disambiguation pages